Emad Alaa (born June 20, 1990) is an Egyptian professional footballer who currently plays as a defensive midfielder for the Egyptian club El Raja SC. In 2017, Alaa signed a 2-year contract for El Raja SC which was promoted to 2017–18 Egyptian Premier League.

References

External links
 

1990 births
Living people
El Raja SC players
Egyptian footballers
Association football midfielders
Ala'ab Damanhour SC players
Al Ittihad Alexandria Club players
El Qanah FC players